The large-billed antwren (Herpsilochmus longirostris) is a species of bird in the family Thamnophilidae. It is found in Bolivia and Brazil. Its natural habitat is subtropical or tropical moist lowland forests.

The large-billed antwren was described by the Austrian ornithologist August von Pelzeln in 1868 and given its current binomial name Herpsilochmus longirostris.

References

large-billed antwren
Birds of the Bolivian Amazon
Birds of Brazil
large-billed antwren
Taxonomy articles created by Polbot